Apolo Airport  is an airstrip serving Apolo, a town in the La Paz Department of Bolivia.

Apolo is in a wide valley of the Cordillera Real range, and there is mountainous terrain in all quadrants except north-northwest. The Apolo non-directional beacon (Ident: APB) is located on the field.

See also

Transport in Bolivia
List of airports in Bolivia

References

External links 
OpenStreetMap - Apolo
OurAirports - Apolo
SkyVector - Apolo
Fallingrain - Apolo Airport
HERE/Nokia Maps - Apolo

Airports in La Paz Department (Bolivia)